Popstar Kids is a Philippine television reality talent competition show broadcast by Q. Hosted by Kyla, it premiered on November 19, 2005. The show concluded on July 29, 2007, with a total of 2 seasons.

Finalists
Rita Iringan - Winner, Season 1
Cholo Bismonte
Julie Anne San Jose
Vanessa Rangadhol
Enzo Almario

These five kids later on formed the singing group Sugarpop.
Kierulf Raboy - Winner, Season 2
Marion Torres - International Winner, Season 2
Tabitha Caro
Suzette Soyangco
Gidget dela Llana
Jalynna Magadia
Jessica Reynoso
Dino Canido
Marion Torres

2005 Philippine television series debuts
2007 Philippine television series endings
Filipino-language television shows
Philippine reality television series
Q (TV network) original programming

pag:Popstar Kids